Belverde is a village in Tuscany, central Italy, administratively a frazione of the comune of Monteriggioni, province of Siena. At the time of the 2001 census its population was 1,272.

Belverde is about 5 km from Siena and 13 km from Monteriggioni.

References 

Frazioni of Monteriggioni